On 8 October 2006, a brief ceremony was held at the Doha Golf Club where the torch was lit with a flame. With the involvement of over 3,000 people, the torch crossed eight former Asian Games host countries and four Gulf Cooperation Council member states. The torch travelled back to Doha held by Sheikh Joan Bin Hamad Al-Thani, and the journey around the city itself started on 25 November 2006 and lasted until the opening ceremony of the Games. The first pit stop was in New Delhi, the birthplace of the Asian Games on 11 October 2006 where the torch's flame was fused together with the Eternal Asian Games Flame which was generated from parabolic mirrors directed straight at the sun at the Dhyan Chand National Stadium. During the fourth stop in Hiroshima on 21 October, the torch's flame was fused together with the Peace flame at the Hiroshima Peace Memorial Park.

During the international leg of the relay, the flame was transported from city to city aboard a Qatar Amiri Flight Airbus A310. On board, the flame was carried and burned continuously in a safety lantern.

Below is a list of places visited by the torch:

Torch lighting
 Doha (8 October)

International route

Qatari route

References

2006 Asian Games
Asian Games torch relays